George Anthony Rabasa (born December 29, 1941) is an American writer and author of four novels and a short story collection. Rabasa has received such honors as The Loft Career Initiative Grant, The Writer's Voice Capricorn Award, and two Minnesota Book Awards.

Background
Rabasa was born December 29, 1941, in Biddeford, Maine to Catalan refugees. He was raised in Mexico City. 
In 1964 he earned a B.A. from the University of the Americas in San Andrés Cholula, Puebla, with a double major in English literature and Journalism..

He currently lives in the State of Minnesota.

Partial bibliography

Novels
 The Wonder Singer (Unbridled Books, 2008)
 The Cleansing (The Permanent Press, 2006)
 Floating Kingdom (Coffee House Press, 1997)

Short stories
 Glass Houses (Coffee House Press, 1996).
Selected by A.M. Homes for the Writer's Voice Capricorn Award for Excellence in Fiction

Anthologies
 “Family Lines”, A Ghost at Heart's Edge, North Atlantic Books, 1999.
 “Jimmy Pearl's Blue Oyster”, 26 Minnesota Writers, Nodin Press, 1995.

Journals
 “Yolanda by Day”, American Literary Review, 2003.
 “Fallen Coconuts and Dead Fish”, Green Hills, 2003.
 “Ask Señor Totol”, Hayden’s Ferry Review, 2002–2003.
 “Hay Soos Saves”, North Dakota Quarterly, 2002.
 “For the Solitary Soul”, South Carolina Review, 2001.
 “Three Incidents in the Early Life of El Perro”, Atlanta Review, 2001.
 “The Beautiful Wife”, Glimmer Train Stories, 1995.

Awards
 The Loft Literary Center Career Initiative Grant, 2008
 A BookSense Notable Book Selection, The Cleansing, 2006
 Minnesota State Arts Board, Artist Fellowship, 2001
 Minnesota Book Award for Novel, Floating Kingdom, 1998
 Minnesota Book Award for Short Fiction, Glass Houses, 1997
 The Writers Voice Capricorn Award, Excellence in Fiction, 1992

References

External links
 

1941 births
Living people
American people of Catalan descent
Novelists from Maine
People from Biddeford, Maine
20th-century American novelists
21st-century American novelists
American male novelists
American male short story writers
20th-century American short story writers
21st-century American short story writers
20th-century American male writers
21st-century American male writers